Little Sandy Creek may refer to the following waterways:

Little Sandy Creek, a tributary of Sandy Creek (Michigan)
Little Sandy Creek (Niobrara River tributary), a stream in Holt County, Nebraska
Little Sandy Creek (Big Sandy Creek), Pennsylvania
Little Sandy Creek (Redbank Creek), Pennsylvania
Little Sandy Creek (Sandy Creek), Pennsylvania